Lord Reims was a New Zealand-bred Thoroughbred racehorse who raced with success in Australia.

Background
Lord Reims was a chestnut son of Zamazaan (FR) from the mare Right On (NZ). He was trained in New Zealand by Cliff Fenwick at Takanini.

Racing career
He excelled at staying races with his major race victories including the 1987 MRC Caulfield Cup (defeating the champion Beau Zam) and three successive SAJC Adelaide Cup’s from 1987 to 1989 at Morphettville Racecourse.

The horse died of colic complications at Melbourne airport returning from over seas.

Lord Reims was buried near the winning post at Morphettville and in 2010 the Lord Reims Stakes was named in his honor.

See also
 Repeat winners of horse races
 Thoroughbred racing in New Zealand

References

1981 racehorse births
Thoroughbred family 20
Racehorses trained in Australia
Racehorses bred in New Zealand
Caulfield Cup winners